Ogljenšak is a settlement in the Municipality of Slovenska Bistrica in northeastern Slovenia. The area is part of the traditional region of Styria. It lies in the foothills of the Pohorje range, just north of Zgornja Polskava. It is now included with the rest of the municipality in the Drava Statistical Region.

References

External links
Ogljenšak at Geopedia

Populated places in the Municipality of Slovenska Bistrica